Tennessee Airways was an airline that was conceived as a regional airline to provide service to cities throughout the Southeastern United States. The airline was in service between 1978 and 1987 and was based out of Knoxville, Tennessee.

Stuart Adcock was president and major shareholder. He was somewhat of a hands-on executive, sometimes flying the planes and cleaning them after flights.

Destinations 
Tennessee
Chattanooga (Chattanooga Metropolitan Airport)
Knoxville (McGhee Tyson Airport) - primary hub 
Memphis (Memphis International Airport) - primary hub 
Nashville (Nashville International Airport)
Tri-Cities (Tri-Cities Regional Airport)
Alabama
Huntsville (Huntsville Municipal Airport)
Georgia
Atlanta (William B. Hartsfield Atlanta International Airport)
Kentucky
Boone County (Cincinnati/Northern Kentucky International Airport)
Lexington (Blue Grass Airport)
London (London-Corbin Airport)*
North Carolina
Charlotte (Douglas Airport)
Greensboro (Greensboro/Winston-Salem/High Point Airport)
Pinehurst (Moore County Airport)*
South Carolina
Greer (Greenville-Spartanburg International Airport)
Virginia
Fairfax County (Washington Dulles International Airport)
Those airports marked with an asterisk (*) no longer have commercial airline service.

Fleet
 Embraer EMB 110
 Piper T1020 (PA-31-350T1020)

See also 
 List of defunct airlines of the United States

References

External links
 Tennessee Airways Timetables at Airtimes.com

Defunct airlines of the United States
Companies based in Knoxville, Tennessee
Airlines established in 1978
Airlines disestablished in 1987
Defunct companies based in Tennessee